The Big Bub's Comedy Show is a stand-up comedy show that hosts comedians at Bub's Brewing Co. located at 65 E. 4th St., downtown Winona, MN.  On July 24, 2010, its first showcase was promoted by comedians Lindsay Hensel and Mark Liedel with performances by John Russell, Bryan Miller, Nate Abshire, and co-promoter Mark Liedel.  Since that time, it has hosted comedians from across the United States including Shane Mauss, Chad Daniels, Nathan Timmel, Mike Brody, comedian from the TV series Pit Boss Ashley Brooks, Kevin Bozeman, Jon Wilson, Robert Baril, and The Almost Homeless Comedy Tour.  On October 4, 2014, The Big Bub's Comedy Show hosted comedian Tim Harmston.

References

External links 
 Official Facebook.

2010 establishments in Minnesota
Comedy clubs in the United States
Live stand-up comedy shows